This list of Nevada state parks comprises protected areas managed by the U.S. state of Nevada, which include state parks, state historic sites, and state recreation areas. The system is managed by the Nevada Division of State Parks within the Nevada Department of Conservation and Natural Resources. The Division of State Parks was created by an act of the Nevada Legislature in 1963. The system manages 23 state park units, some of which have multiple units. The Division is headquartered in Carson City and has two management regions statewide: the Northern Region (Fallon Office) and the Southern Region (Las Vegas Office).

List of current Nevada State Parks

Former Nevada State Parks 
Floyd Lamb State Park was renamed Floyd Lamb Park at Tule Springs on July 2, 2007, when ownership was transferred to the City of Las Vegas.
Dangberg Home Ranch Historic Park was operated by Nevada State Parks until June 30, 2011, when ownership was transferred to Douglas County.
The former Walker Lake State Park has become the Walker Lake State Recreation Area.

See also
List of national parks of the United States

References

External links
 Nevada State Parks Department of Conservation and Natural Resources

Nevada state parks